The School of Facility Management Groningen belongs to the Hanze University Groningen in Groningen, Netherlands and offers a BBA degree programme in International Facility Management.

School of Facility Management is international: students come from the European Union countries, Middle East, Middle America and the Far East and can follow careers both in the Netherlands and abroad. The language used is English.

The degree in International Bachelor of Business Administration prepares students for executive positions such as: Head of Facility Organisation, Head of Safety and Security, Purchase Manager, New Development Project Manager, Catering Manager, Regional manager of Cleaning Services, Events Project Manager, Relocation Coordinator and others.

Bachelor program
 International Facility Management Studies (BBA)

Students will graduate with a BBA in either Corporate or Commercial Facility Management.

Curriculum 
 First year: An introduction to Facility Management

The first year is an introduction to (international) Facility management. Students will gain insight into policy making as well as developing a sustainable and innovative (office) work environment. Furthermore, students will have the possibility to learn how Facility managers evaluate the effectiveness, efficiency and service level of the Facility Organization as well as manage and structure services, e.g. cleaning or catering for a Health Care institution.

 Second year: Specialization in Corporate or Commercial Facility Management

In the second year students will prepare themselves for either of the specializations: Corporate or commercial Facility management. Within the corporate Facility management students will gain knowledge and skills with regards to purchasing services or products as well as policy planning for long term housing for instance. Commercial Facility management focuses on creating marketing strategies for newly developed services or products related to Facility Management (Security, Cleaning, building Maintenance, etc.) and on drafting plans for the improvement of the quality of the facility performance of service providers.

 Third year: Students go abroad

Once students have mastered the general concepts of international facility management, students will specialize further in either corporate or Commercial Facility Management. Students have the opportunity to study abroad for five months at one of the Hanze partner institutes in Europe, Asia, the U.S. or Australia (For Dutch students this is mandatory). On top of that, students will put all their knowledge and skills into practice in a five-month internship at an organization or company related to either the corporate or the commercial profile.

 Fourth year: The graduation project

The first semester of the fourth year offers students a program matching the specialization prior to the graduation phase. Students will deal with strategic Management in the corporate profile or entrepreneurship in the commercial stream. In both profiles students learn to deal with change management. The graduation phase, the final part of the Bachelor program, involves a graduation project in which students will act as a junior Facility management advisor and execute a complicated assignment, independently, for a company in the area of Facility management in an international context.

External links 
  Official website

Hanze University of Applied Sciences